Halielloides is a genus of sea snails, marine gastropod mollusks in the family Eulimidae.

Species

Species within this genus include the following:

 Halielloides fragilis (Bouchet & Warén, 1986)
 Halielloides nitidus (Verrill, 1884)
 Halielloides verrilliana (Bush, 1909)

Species brought into synonymy
 Halielloides ingolfiana (Bouchet & Warén, 1986): synonym of  Halielloides nitidus (Verrill, 1884)
 Halielloides ingolfianus Bouchet & Warén, 1986: synonym of Halielloides nitidus (Verrill, 1884)

References

External links
 To World Register of Marine Species

Eulimidae